General elections were held in Turkey on 2 May 1954. The electoral system used was the multiple non-transferable vote. The result was a landslide victory for the Democrat Party, which won 503 of the 541 seats. Voter turnout was 88.6%.

Results

References

1954
1954 elections in Turkey